Robert Graham Irwin (born 23 August 1946) is a British historian, novelist, and writer on Arabic literature.

Biography
Irwin attended Epsom College, read modern history at the University of Oxford, and did graduate research at the School of Oriental and African Studies (SOAS) under the supervision of Bernard Lewis.  His thesis was on the Mamluk reconquest of the Crusader states, but he failed to complete it. During his studies, he converted to Islam and spent some time in a dervish monastery in Algeria. From 1972 he was a lecturer in medieval history at the University of St. Andrews. He gave up academic life in 1977 in order to write fiction, while continuing to lecture part-time at Oxford, Cambridge and SOAS. Irwin is currently a research associate at SOAS, and the Middle East editor of The Times Literary Supplement. He has published a history of Orientalism and is an acknowledged expert on The Arabian Nights.

Many of Irwin's novels focus on Arabic themes. This includes his first, the acclaimed dark fantasy novel
The Arabian Nightmare, which was inspired by Jan Potocki's The Manuscript Found in Saragossa. Later novels would focus on diverse subjects, such as British Surrealism (Exquisite Corpse) and Satanism in Swinging London (Satan Wants Me). A character from Satan Wants Me, the Satanist Charlie Felton, has a cameo in the 1969 episode of the League of Extraordinary Gentlemen comic. Alan Moore, the comic's creator, has described Irwin as a "fantastic writer".

Orientalism

In 2006, Irwin published For Lust of Knowing: The Orientalists and their Enemies, his critique of Edward Said's Orientalism (1978). Among various points, he maintains that Said focused his attention on the British and French in his critique of Orientalism, while it was German scholars who made the original contributions. He notes that Said linked the academic Orientalism in those countries with imperialist designs on the Middle East, yet, by the 19th and the early 20th centuries, it was more proper to regard Russia as an empire having imperialist designs on the Caucasus region and Central Asia. Irwin maintains that the issue of Russia's actual imperialist designs is avoided by Said. Another of Irwin's key points is that oriental scholarship, or "Orientalism", "owes more to Muslim scholarship than most Muslims realise."

Maya Jasanoff in the London Review of Books argued: "...Irwin's factual corrections, however salutary, do not so much knock down the theoretical claims of Orientalism as chip away at single bricks. They also do nothing to discount the fertility of Orientalism for other academics. The most thought-provoking works it has inspired have not blindly accepted Said's propositions, but have expanded and modified them."

Published works

Fiction
The Arabian Nightmare (Dedalus 1983)
The Limits of Vision (Dedalus 1986)
The Mysteries of Algiers (Dedalus 1988)
Exquisite Corpse (Dedalus 1995)
Prayer-Cushions of the Flesh (Dedalus 1997)
Satan Wants Me (Dedalus 1999)
Wonders Will Never Cease (Dedalus 2016)
My Life is like a Fairy Tale (Dedalus 2019)
The Runes Have Been Cast (Dedalus 2021)

Nonfiction
The Middle East in the Middle Ages: the Early Mamluk Sultanate 1250–1382 (Croom Helm 1986) 
The Arabian Nights: A Companion (Allen Lane 1994)
Islamic Art (Laurence King 1997)
Night and Horses and the Desert: the Penguin Anthology of Classical Arabic Literature (Allen Lane 1999) 
The Alhambra (Harvard University Press, 2005).
For Lust of Knowing: the Orientalists and their Enemies (Allen Lane, 2006). (US edition: Dangerous Knowledge: Orientalism and Its Discontents (Overlook Press, 2006)
Camel (Reaktion Books 2010)
Mamluks and Crusaders (Ashgate Variorum 2010)
Visions of the Jinn; Illustrators of the Arabian Nights (The Arcadian Library 2010) 
Memoirs of a Dervish: Sufis, Mystics and the Sixties (Profile Books, 2011)

Quotes
"During the Rushdie case, the leader of the largest Buddhist organisation in Britain was asked how Buddhists would react to blasphemy, and he answered: "We support it, because it makes people think." – That was well said. I don't know how to react, but it strikes me that Muhammed is increasingly given a divine status which he didn't have in original Islam. Muhammed is no god. He is a human being making mistakes which, by the way, is evident from the authorised accounts about his life."

On Edward Said's work Orientalism: "I am a medievalist, but he hates the Middle Ages. Altogether he loathes the past, he does not have the ability to enter into the spirit of other ages. He lies about European novelists and twists their words; I am myself a novelist with great sympathy for some of those whom he denounces in his book. Finally, I am an orientalist, too, and his book is a long and persevering polemic against my subject, so I need to ask: is there anything at all to like in Said's book? – No. It is written far too quickly and carelessly. It abounds with misprints and mis-spelled names. It is an extremely polemic book, and throughout time many polemic books for or against Islam and the Muslim world have been written, but none have been taken seriously in the same way as Said."

On Edward Said:"The fact is that researchers cannot build anything on Said's thoughts-dead-end. ... He has made it difficult for Westerners to say anything critical about Islam and the Muslim world. You cannot do that because then you run the risk of getting denounced as an orientalist, i.e. a racist, an imperialist and other terrible things."

See also
Arabist
Orientalism
Orientalism (1978 book)

References

External links
 at Dedalus Books

1946 births
Living people
People educated at Epsom College
Alumni of SOAS University of London
Converts to Islam
British orientalists
20th-century English novelists
English fantasy writers
Fellows of the Royal Society of Literature
British historians of Islam
Translators of One Thousand and One Nights
Postmodern writers
Alumni of the University of Oxford
Academics of the University of St Andrews
English male short story writers
English short story writers
English male novelists
20th-century British short story writers
20th-century English male writers
People associated with The Institute for Cultural Research